The 132nd Boat Race took place on 29 March 1986.  Held annually, the Boat Race is a side-by-side rowing race between crews from the Universities of Oxford and Cambridge along the River Thames.  Cambridge won by seven lengths and took their first victory in eleven years, in one of the fastest winning times in the history of the event. Isis won the reserve race, while Oxford were victorious in the Women's Boat Race.

Background
The Boat Race is a side-by-side rowing competition between the University of Oxford (sometimes referred to as the "Dark Blues") and the University of Cambridge (sometimes referred to as the "Light Blues").  First held in 1829, the race takes place on the  Championship Course on the River Thames in southwest London.  The rivalry is a major point of honour between the two universities and followed throughout the United Kingdom and broadcast worldwide. Oxford went into the race as reigning champions, having beaten Cambridge by  lengths in the previous year's race.  However Cambridge held the overall lead, with 68 victories to Oxford's 62 (excluding the "dead heat" of 1877) despite Oxford having won the previous ten races. 

The first Women's Boat Race took place in 1927, but did not become an annual fixture until the 1960s. Up until 2014, the contest was conducted as part of the Henley Boat Races, but as of the 2015 race, it is held on the River Thames, on the same day as the men's main and reserve races.  The reserve race, contested between Oxford's Isis boat and Cambridge's Goldie boat has been held since 1965.  It usually takes place on the Tideway, prior to the main Boat Race.

The race was sponsored by Ladbrokes for the tenth consecutive year, estimated to be worth about £30,000 to each boat club, and was umpired by former Cambridge rower Mike Sweeney.

Crews
Cambridge's crew featured only two rowers over the age of 24 while Oxford had just three men under 25. Oxford saw three Blues return while Cambridge welcomed back four. The Cambridge crew featured three international rowers: two Canadians (Gibson and Wilson), and the American Pew. The Light Blue cox, Carole Burton, was the first woman to steer the Cambridge boat. Oxford's MacDonald was the oldest in the race at the age of 30, he was accompanied in the boat by international rowers Clark and Livingstone from the United States and Jones from Australia. Dan Topolski was the Oxford coach while Cambridge relied on Alan Inns and Canadian Olympic coach Neil Campbell. Cambridge were clear favourites to win, but prior to the race, Topolski claimed his crew had "pulled themselves back into contention by sheer hard work."

Races

Oxford won the toss and elected to start from the Surrey station.  The predicted severe wind did not materialise and from the start, Cambridge pulled ahead. A half-length lead by the end of Putney boathouses became a two length lead by Hammersmith Bridge, and Cambridge's cox Burton steered towards the safer Surrey side, extending Cambridge's lead to 14 seconds by Chiswick Steps.  Continuing to pull away, Cambridge passed the finishing post 21 seconds and seven lengths ahead of Oxford.  It was the sixth fastest time in the history of the race. This was Cambridge's first victory in eleven years and took the overall record to 69–62 in favour of Cambridge.

In the reserve race, Oxford's Isis beat Cambridge's Goldie by six lengths, while Oxford won the 41st Women's Boat Race.

Reaction
The trophy was presented by former Cambridge student Prince Edward. Cambridge stroke John Pritchard said "After our initial start we built up for 20 strokes, steadied and then just grinded away." He added "I was just stirring the tea while the others did the work." Cambridge cox Carole Burton noted "I went where I wanted to go." Following tradition, Pritchard picked her up and threw her into the river. Oxford's Jones remarked "we were as well prepared as last year but we found no magic." Topolski conceded that even had Oxford been at their best, they would still have lost the race.

References

External links
 Official website

1986 in English sport
The Boat Race
March 1986 sports events in the United Kingdom
1986 in rowing
1986 sports events in London